Erika Graf (born 10 August 1977) is a Uruguayan swimmer. She competed in the women's 200 metre breaststroke event at the 1996 Summer Olympics.

References

1977 births
Living people
Uruguayan female swimmers
Olympic swimmers of Uruguay
Swimmers at the 1996 Summer Olympics
Place of birth missing (living people)
Female breaststroke swimmers